Santiago is a municipality located in the center of the Mexican state of Nuevo León. It is part of the Monterrey metropolitan area and its area comprises around 763.8 km². According to the 2005 census, its population is 37,886 inhabitants.

"La Boca" Dam, is one of the water reservoirs serving the metropolitan area, and is located within the municipality. "Cola de Caballo" is a famous waterfall and tourist attraction.

Santiago, Nuevo León, was named a "Pueblo Mágico" in 2006 by Mexico's Secretariat of Tourism. Santiago joined the UNESCO Global Network of Learning Cities in 2017.

Climate
Santiago has a humid subtropical climate (Köppen climate classification Cwa) with cool, dry winters and hot and humid summers. It is receives almost twice as much rain as nearby Monterrey.

References

External links
 Government of Santiago, Official Website

Populated places in Nuevo León
Municipalities of Nuevo León
Monterrey metropolitan area
Populated places established in 1648
Pueblos Mágicos
1648 establishments in the Spanish Empire